Alfred Pfaff (16 July 1926 – 27 December 2008) was a German football player and World Cup winner with West Germany in 1954.

Life 

Pfaff was capped seven times between 1953 and 1956 for the West German national team, scoring two goals as an inside forward.

The highlight of his career was winning the 1954 World Cup in Switzerland. Pfaff had an appearance in the preliminary round against Hungary (3–8) and scored a goal in the 26th minute.

His club was Eintracht Frankfurt with whom he won the 1959 German Championship, and in 1960 reached the finals of Champion's Cup against Real Madrid. The left-footed Don Alfredo was the head of the team. Pfaff was a true playmaker with exceptionally good ball control and great skills at free kicks. Pfaff probably would have accumulated more than seven caps if Fritz Walter had not played the same role for West Germany as Pfaff played for Eintracht Frankfurt. In 1954, Atlético Madrid offered him 180,000 D-Mark but his wife Edith was against a move to Spain. Possibly Pfaff's greatest game was the 6–1 against Rangers in the 1959–60 semifinal first leg of the European Cup, which was followed by a 6–3 win of Eintracht Frankfurt in Glasgow in the second leg. He ended his career in 1962 at the age of 36.

Besides his sports career, Pfaff was an innkeeper and had a bar near the Hauptwache in Frankfurt. Since the 1960s, he lived as a barkeeper and hotel keeper in Zittenfelden in Morretal, Odenwald.

Honours
Eintracht Frankfurt
 German championship: 1958–59
 European Cup: runners-up 1959–60
 Oberliga Süd: 1952–53, 1958–59; runners-up 1953–54, 1960–61

West Germany
 FIFA World Cup: 1954

References

External links 
 

1926 births
2008 deaths
Footballers from Frankfurt
German footballers
Eintracht Frankfurt players
1954 FIFA World Cup players
FIFA World Cup-winning players
Germany international footballers
Association football midfielders
West German footballers